Andreas Jacques Varsakopoulos (born 14 August 1990) is a Greek-American who lives and performs in South Korea as a television, radio personality and English lecturer. He was born to a Greek father and an American mother. He holds a University of Massachusetts Boston master's degree in applied linguistics with a concentration in foreign language pedagogy.

Professional life
Varsakopoulos has dual citizenship in the United States and Greece. He attended the University of Vermont, graduating with a Bachelor of Science (BS) and Secondary Education in 2012. In the summer of 2012 he moved to South Korea and began work as an English teacher. During his time in Korea he began learning Korean through friends, co-workers and self-study. In the summer of 2015 he first appeared on the television program Non-Summit as the Greek representative. He is noted for his enthusiasm and variety of expressions. Andreas has an older brother, Vasilis ("Vas"), who is a former chemicals investment banking associate at Nomura Securities and avid sailor.

Following his success on the show, he continued work as host of the radio show "Can, can, can" (영어! 할 수 있다 CAN CAN CAN) for EBS radio station. Due to his position as a foreigner living in Korea he shares his perspective on common misconceptions of the English language when used by Koreans, or Konglish.

Filmography

Television series

Commercials

References

External links 

 

1990 births
Living people
Greek television personalities
Greek schoolteachers
American television personalities
Schoolteachers from Massachusetts
Greek expatriates in South Korea
Greek people of American descent
University of Vermont alumni
University of Massachusetts Boston alumni
21st-century Greek educators
21st-century American educators
People from Giannitsa